RV Mirai is a Japanese oceanographic research vessel. She was originally built as the nuclear-powered general cargo ship Mutsu, but never carried commercial cargo.

History

Development and construction

Mutsu (1972–1996) 

The reactor was completed on 25 August 1972, and fuel was loaded on 4 September. When officials announced that the first test run was to be run at the pier in Ōminato, local protests forced them to reconsider. The ship departed Ōminato on 26 August 1974, and the reactor attained criticality on 28 August.

Radiation accident
As the crew brought the reactor up to 1.4% of capacity at 5pm on 1 September 1974, there was a minor shielding inadequacy that permitted the escape of neutrons and gamma rays from the reactor shielding enclosure. Westinghouse Electric Corporation had reviewed the design and warned of this possibility, but no changes were made to the design. There was no significant radiation exposure, but it became a political issue, with local fisherman blocking her return to port for more than 50 days. The government finally came to an agreement with the local government and fishermen; the Mutsu was allowed back to port on condition that it was to find a new home port, and the ship returned to Ōminato on 15 October.

In Sasebo, between 1978 and 1982, various modifications were made to the reactor shield of the Mutsu, and its home port was moved to Sekinehama in 1983. Following an overhaul, the Mutsu was completed in February 1991. She then completed her original design objective of travelling  in testing, and was decommissioned in 1992. Over 25 years the programme had cost more than 120 billion yen (about US$1.2 billion).

Mirai (1996–present) 

After removing the reactor in 1995 and decontaminating the vessel, Mutsu was rebuilt as the ocean observation vessel Mirai.

Mutsu Science Museum 
The reactor room, control room, bridge, bow, and propeller were converted into a museum and are open to the public at the Mutsu Science Museum.  Visitors can interact with the controls in the control room and view the reactor vessel through several viewing ports. Reactor room image 1 Reactor room image 2 Reactor vessel through viewing port image Control room image Bridge image

The nuclear material from the ship is stored across the street from the museum at a facility operated by the Japan Atomic Energy Agency.

See also 
 Savannah, the world's first nuclear-powered cargo ship
 Otto Hahn, a German nuclear-powered cargo ship
 Sevmorput, a Soviet and later Russian nuclear-powered cargo ship

References 

Research vessels of Japan
Japan Agency for Marine-Earth Science and Technology
1969 ships
Ships built by IHI Corporation